Duisburg II is an electoral constituency (German: Wahlkreis) represented in the Bundestag. It elects one member via first-past-the-post voting. Under the current constituency numbering system, it is designated as constituency 116. It is located in the Ruhr region of North Rhine-Westphalia, comprising the northern part of the city of Duisburg.

Duisburg II was created for the inaugural 1949 federal election. Since 2013, it has been represented by Mahmut Özdemir of the Social Democratic Party (SPD).

Geography
Duisburg II is located in the Ruhr region of North Rhine-Westphalia. As of the 2021 federal election, it comprises the northern part of the independent city of Duisburg, specifically the Stadtbezirke of Walsum, Hamborn, Meiderich/Beeck, and Homberg/Ruhrort/Baerl, as well as the Stadtteil of Duissern from Mitte.

History
Duisburg II was created in 1949. In the 1949 election, it was North Rhine-Westphalia constituency 34 in the numbering system. From 1953 through 1961, it was number 93. From 1965 through 1976, it was number 91. From 1980 through 1998, it was number 85. From 2002 through 2009, it was number 117. Since 2013, it has been number 116.

Originally, the constituency comprised the area of Duisburg south of the Ruhr except for the Stadtteile of Laar and Ruhrort. From 1965 through 1976, it comprised the area of Duisburg south of the Ruhr. From 1980 through 2009, it comprised the Stadtbezirke of Walsum, Hamborn, Meiderich/Beeck, and Homberg/Ruhrort/Baerl. In the 2013 election, it acquired the Stadtteil of Duissern.

Members
The constituency has been held by the Social Democratic Party (SPD) during all but two Bundestag terms since 1949. It was first represented by Gustav Sander of the SPD for a single term from 1949, before Fritz Berendsen of the Christian Democratic Union (CDU) won it in 1953. He was re-elected in 1957. Hanns Theis regained it for the SPD in 1961, and was succeeded by Hermann Spillecke in 1965. He served until 1980, followed by Günter Schluckebier, who was representative until 1998. Johannes Pflug held the seat from 1998 to 2013. Mahmut Özdemir was elected in 2013, and re-elected in 2017 and 2021.

Election results

2021 election

2017 election

2013 election

2009 election

Notes

References

Federal electoral districts in North Rhine-Westphalia
1949 establishments in West Germany
Constituencies established in 1949
Duisburg